Volkswagen R is the brand used by the German auto manufacturer Volkswagen to indicate a sport or high performance model. An "R" badge is placed on the grille, front fenders and trunk of R-model vehicles to indicate the vehicle's trim level.  

The R-marque is used on certain performance models alongside "GT" model designations, such as the GTI, GLI, GTE and GTD. These vehicles are also sold as "sport models" but are less performance-oriented when compared to vehicles such as the Golf R.

The 2022 Volkswagen Touareg R-Line was renamed to R-Style.

Models

Golf R32 (Mk4) 

Volkswagen began production of the Mk4 R32 in 2002, for the 2003 model year. It was the world's first production car with a dual-clutch gearbox (DSG) — available for the German market. Due to unexpected popularity, Volkswagen decided to sell the car in the United States and Australia as the 2004 model year Volkswagen R32. Further additions included Haldex Traction-based 4motion on-demand four-wheel drive system, a new six-speed manual transmission, independent rear suspension, Climatronic automatic climate control, sport seats from König with R32 badging, 18" OZ Aristo alloy wheels (Ronal produced the wheels towards the end of production), Electronic Stability Programme, larger  disc brakes with gloss blue painted calipers, sunroof (for the US), Xenon Headlamps (for Europa), and model-specific bodywork additions.

Golf R32 (Mk5) 

In September 2005, the Mk5 R32 went on sale in Europe. United Kingdom sales began in November that year. It features an updated 3.2-litre VR6 engine of that fitted to the previous Mk4 version, with an extra  due to a reworked inlet manifold. Going from 0 to  will take 6.5 s, reduced to 6.2 s with the Direct-Shift Gearbox.

Compared with the previous Mk4 R32, it is 0.1 seconds faster for the manual version, while the newer R32 is about  heavier. As with the previous R32; there is the Haldex Traction-based 4motion part-time four-wheel drive, now through 18" Zolder 20-spoke alloy wheels. Stopping the R32 comes in the form of blue-painted brake calipers with  discs at the front and  disks at the rear.

The Mk5 R32 was released in the US in August 2007 with a limited production run of 5000. Each R32 has its production number laser etched on its steering wheel.

In Chile, the Golf Mk5 was only offered in this model. Only the Brazilian-made Mk4 was sold.

Passat R36 (B6) 

At the Frankfurt Motor Show in September 2007, Volkswagen launched the 'R line' R36, created by Volkswagen Individual GmbH.

The name "R36" is derived from the engine displacement, 3.6-litres.

The R36 features redesigned front and rear spoilers, 4 wheel drive, DSG gearbox with paddleshift on the flat-bottom steering wheel, 18" Omanyt aluminium alloy wheels,  lowered  suspension, 'R' engraved stainless steel pedals, Recaro seats with R36 logo, heated front and rear seats, Bi-Xenon headlights with cornering function, and twin rear muffler tailpipes.

Touareg R50 (7L)

The Touareg R50 is the third Volkswagen after the Golf and Passat to be given the 'R' treatment by Volkswagen Individual GmbH. The R50 global launch was at the 2007 Australian International Motor Show.

Scirocco R (Mk. 3)
 
The Volkswagen Scirocco R was introduced in 2009, powered by a 2.0L TSI turbocharged Inline 4, based on new the 2 door Scirocco coupe introduced the year prior. The Scirocco R model featured a body kit exclusive to the model, with a much larger front opening than the mainstream Scirocco. The model was retired alongside the Scirocco nameplate in 2017.

Golf R (Mk7)

Like the GTI, the Golf R is also built as a three- or five-door hatchback. Compared to the GTI's powerplant, the Golf R's engine has a modified cylinder head, exhaust valves, valve seats and springs, pistons, injection valves and larger intercooler and turbocharger. DSG equipped models also come with an auxiliary oil cooler on the passenger side.

T-Roc R 

The T-Roc R was released in March 2019. It is the first SUV tuned by Volkswagen R. The T-Roc R shares the all-wheel drive powertrain from the Golf R, including the engine which is a turbocharged  2.0-litre four-cylinder engine mated to a 7-speed DSG automatic.

Tiguan R 

The Tiguan R was released in June 2020 alongside the facelifted model. Other performance upgrades of the Tiguan R include lowered suspension, 21-inch wheels, uprated brakes, and an available Akrapovič exhaust. A driving mode selector is included complete with a “Race” setting which can be prompted by a dedicated button on the steering wheel.

Arteon R 

The Arteon R was released in 2020 alongside the facelifted model and variant version.

R-Line
Volkswagen began offering the R-Line trim level in 2011, being first introduced on the Volkswagen CC. R-Line vehicles consist of sport upgrades that are mostly cosmetic, such as different bumpers and wheels.

See also 
 Audi S and RS models

References

External links
 Official website

Volkswagen vehicles
Official motorsports and performance division of automakers